Normand Toupin was a politician in Quebec, Canada.

Background

He was born on November 21, 1933 in Saint-Maurice, Quebec, Mauricie.

Political career

Toupin was elected as a Liberal candidate to the provincial legislature in the district of Champlain in 1970.  He was re-elected in 1973.  He was appointed to the Cabinet in 1970.  He lost against Parti Québécois candidate Marcel Gagnon in 1976.

Footnotes

1933 births
Living people
Quebec Liberal Party MNAs